Major General Cosmo Alexander Richard Nevill CB CBE DSO (14 July 1907 – 19 September 2002) was a senior British Army officer who fought in World War II in Western Europe and later commanded the 2nd Division.

Military career
Nevill was educated at Harrow School and the Royal Military College Sandhurst. He was commissioned into the Royal Fusiliers in 1927 and then served in India from 1932. He fought in the Second World War in Burma and then took part in the Normandy landings as Commanding Officer of the 2nd Battalion of the Devonshire Regiment. His battalion captured the Longues-sur-Mer battery and took 120 prisoners, earning him the Distinguished Service Order (DSO).

After the War he served on the General Staff of the Military Staff Committee at the United Nations in New York. He became Commanding Officer of 1st Bn Royal Fusiliers in Germany in 1950, Commander of 6th Infantry Brigade at Münster and Wuppertal in 1951 and Commandant of the School of Infantry at Warminster in 1954. His last appointment was as General Officer Commanding (GOC) of the 2nd Infantry Division at Hilden in 1956 before he retired in 1960 following a heart attack.

In retirement he became a respected oil painter.

Family
In 1934 he married Grania Goodliffe; they had a son and a daughter.

References

1907 births
2002 deaths
British Army major generals
Royal Fusiliers officers
Companions of the Order of the Bath
Commanders of the Order of the British Empire
Companions of the Distinguished Service Order
People educated at Harrow School
Graduates of the Royal Military College, Sandhurst
People from Bordon
British Army personnel of World War II
Military personnel from Hampshire